Air Seoul is a South Korean low-cost carrier and a subsidiary of Asiana Airlines. The airline is based at Incheon International Airport in Seoul, from which it operates flights to international destinations. It launched operations on 11 July 2016.

History
Since early 2014, Asiana Airlines had considered launching a second low-cost carrier (LCC) in addition to Air Busan. It initially faced difficulties in proceeding with the project because of the Asiana Airlines Flight 214 crash in July 2013. Asiana has only a minority 46% stake in Air Busan, while it has a controlling stake in Air Seoul. Air Busan is based in Busan, which has allowed other LCCs such as Jin Air and Jeju Air to fill the Seoul market; Air Seoul is based in Seoul. The goals of Air Seoul are to strengthen Asiana's competition with other South Korean LCCs and to improve Asiana's performance in certain markets, such as secondary Japanese cities.

The airline was established on 7 April 2015. In June 2016, Air Seoul operated trial flights within South Korea. On 5 July 2016, the Ministry of Land, Infrastructure and Transport announced it had granted Air Seoul its air operator's certificate. Flights between Seoul–Gimpo and Jeju commenced on 11 July. The airline started flights to Japan in October 2016, its first international routes and has since moved to become a purely international airline.

In 2018, it carried 1.7 million passengers in 2018, up by 109% from 2017.

On 16 December 2019, Air Seoul launched a Hanoi – Seoul route. The airline has confirmed that Tam Vuong had become an official representative of Air Seoul in Vietnam

Corporate affairs
Air Seoul is a fully owned subsidiary of Asiana Airlines. Its headquarters are located in the Kumho Asiana Main Tower in Seoul, and its Chief Executive Officer is Cho Jin-man.

On 1 January 2018, Air Seoul inaugurated its new Chief Executive Officer, formerly Ryu Kwang-hee.

On 1 January 2021, Air Seoul appointed its new Chief Executive Officer prior to Asiana Airlines acquisition, replacing Cho Kyu-yung.

Destinations
, Air Seoul flies the following destinations:

Fleet

Current fleet

, Air Seoul operates the following aircraft:

Retired fleet
 Air Seoul had operated the following aircraft:

Services
On 7 November 2016, Air Seoul announced that it had collaborated with Naver WEBTOON to produce a safety video. Some of the works featured in this video include Denma, The Sound of Heart, and Noblesse.

Air Seoul began offering an in-flight magazine entitled Your Seoul to passengers in January 2017. The magazine advertises the tourist attractions in the airline's hub city, Seoul.

On 21 March 2019, Air Seoul with collaboration of Naver WEBTOON's LICO introduced a new in-flight safety video. Air Seoul is the first Korean airline to produce an in-flight safety video based on 3D animation created using LICO's character Hwang-goo.

On 7 October 2019, Air Seoul launches in-flight entertainment service named Cinema in the Sky.

See also
 Asiana Airlines
 List of airlines of South Korea
 Transport in South Korea

References

External links
 

Asiana Airlines
Airlines of South Korea
Airlines established in 2014
Companies based in Seoul
South Korean brands
Low-cost carriers
South Korean companies established in 2014
Star Alliance affiliate members